Margarita Esther Henríquez Rodríguez (born April 17, 1991) is the winner of the third season of Latin American Idol, which she won on October 9, 2008.

Biography
Henríquez became the youngest contestant to win and the third one since Carlos Peña. Henríquez beat the runner up María José Castillo for the title. She released her first album under the Sony BMG label on December 1, 2008. It has been very successful in Panama. It contains six songs that she performed during the TV Show. Her song "Vuela" has been successful on the Panamenian radio stations.

References

External links

1991 births
Living people
Idols (TV series) winners
Latin American Idol participants
21st-century Panamanian women singers
21st-century Panamanian singers
Place of birth missing (living people)